Samiabad-e Arbab Din Mohammad (also Romanized as Samī‘ābād-e Arbāb Dīn Moḩammad) is a city in Zam Rural District, Pain Jam District, Torbat-e Jam County, Razavi Khorasan Province, Iran. At the 2006 census, its population was 1,408, in 314 families.

References 

Populated places in Torbat-e Jam County

Cities in Razavi Khorasan Province